William John Francis Naughton (12 June 1910 – 9 January 1992) was an Irish-born British playwright and author, best known for his play Alfie.

Early life
Born into relative poverty in Ballyhaunis, County Mayo, Ireland, he moved to Bolton, Lancashire, England, in 1914 as a child.  There he attended Saint Peter and Paul's School, and worked as a weaver, coal-bagger and lorry-driver before he started writing.

Writing career

His stage play, Alfie, adapted for the 1966 film starring Michael Caine in the eponymous role, originated in a radio play, Alfie Elkins and His Little Life, first broadcast on the BBC Third Programme in 1962, which became a production at the Mermaid Theatre in 1963. It transferred to the West End before a very brief run on Broadway. Naughton was a prolific writer of plays, novels, short stories and children's books. His preferred environment was working-class society, which is reflected in much of his written work.

In addition to Alfie, two of his other plays have been made into feature films, All in Good Time (1963), filmed as The Family Way (1966), starring John Mills, and Spring and Port Wine (1970), starring James Mason in the role of Rafe Crompton, an adaptation of a play first performed in 1959. His novel Alfie Darling, the sequel to his earlier novel and play, was also filmed, with Alan Price succeeding Michael Caine in the lead role. Both Alfie and Alfie Darling were drawn upon for the 2004 film with Jude Law in the eponymous role.

His work also includes the novel One Small Boy (1957), and the collection of short stories The Goalkeeper's Revenge And Other Stories (1961). His 1977 children's novel My Pal Spadger is an account of his childhood in 1920s Bolton.

Many of his plays were performed at the Octagon Theatre, Bolton.  An 85-seat adaptable studio theatre within the Octagon is named after him.

Awards
During his lifetime, he received the following awards:
Screenwriters Guide Award (1967 and 1968)
Italia Prize for Radio Play (1974)
Children's Rights Workshop Other Award (1978)
Portico Literary Prize (1987)
The Hon. Fellowship, Bolton Institute of Higher Education (1988).

Death
Naughton died in 1992, aged 81, in Ballasalla on the Isle of Man. A "Bill Naughton Short Story Competition", administered by The Kenny/Naughton Autumn School, was named in his honour.

Bibliography

Plays
 My Flesh, My Blood (1957) (revised as Spring and Port Wine)
 Alfie (1963) (adapted for 1966 film Alfie)
 All in Good Time (1963) (adapted for 1966 film The Family Way)
 He Was Gone When We Got There (1966)
 June Evening (1966)
 Spring and Port Wine (1967) (adapted for 1970 film Spring and Port Wine)
 Keep It in the Family (1967) (Americanized version of Spring and Port Wine)
 Annie And Fanny (1967)
 Lighthearted Intercourse (1971)
 Derby Day (1994)

Novels
 A Roof Over Your Head (1945)
 Pony Boy (1946)
 Rafe Granite (1947)
 One Small Boy (1957)
 Alfie (1966)
 Alfie Darling (1970)
 My Pal Spadger (1977)

Short Story Collections
 Late Night on Watling Street (1959) 
 The Goalkeeper's Revenge (1961) 
 The Bees Have Stopped Working: And Other Stories (1976)
 Spit Nolan (1988)
 Ricky, Karim and Spit Nolan: Adventure Short Stories (2003) (with Jenny Alexander, Pratima Mitchell)

Autobiography
 On the Pig’s Back: An Autobiographical Excursion. Oxford: Oxford U.P.(1987)
 Saintly Billy: A Catholic Boyhood. Oxford: Oxford U.P.(1988)
 Neither Use Nor Ornament: A Memoir of Bolton: 1920s. Newcastle upon Tyne: Bloodaxe.(1995)

References

External links
Bolton Museum and Archive Service - Bill Naughton

Radio plays at ukonline 

People from Bolton
Prix Italia winners
1910 births
1992 deaths
20th-century English dramatists and playwrights
English male dramatists and playwrights
Proletarian literature
20th-century English male writers